Fernando Matos (born 1 April 1941) is a Portuguese judoka. He competed in the men's middleweight event at the 1964 Summer Olympics.

References

1941 births
Living people
Portuguese male judoka
Olympic judoka of Portugal
Judoka at the 1964 Summer Olympics
Place of birth missing (living people)
20th-century Portuguese people